Ctenocidaridae is a family of echinoderms belonging to the order Cidaroida.

Genera:
 Aporocidaris Agassiz & Clark, 1907
 Ctenocidaris Mortensen, 1910
 Homalocidaris Mortensen, 1928
 Notocidaris Mortensen, 1909
 Rhynchocidaris Mortensen, 1909

References

 
Cidaroida
Echinoderm families